Ayo Obe is a British-Nigerian lawyer, columnist, TV presenter and human rights activist.

Early life and education 
Obe was born on May 24, 1955 in the United Kingdom. She attended the University of Wales.

Career 
Obe is known for Nigeria's human rights, legal and social movements, and advocating for democratic reforms. She was the president of the Civil Liberties Organisation and advocated for the actualisation of Chief MKO Abiola's 1993 presidential election victory. She was listed as one of the heroes of June 12. Her passport was seized in March 1996 while leaving Nigeria to attend a meeting of the UN Human Rights Committee in New York as a result of her activism.

She chaired the Transition Monitoring Group which was an election-monitoring and democracy-building coalition of Nigerian NGOs from 1999 to 2001. She also represented the coalition from 2001 to 2006 at the Police Service Commission (PSC).

She serves as a managing partner in a Lagos based law firm named Ogunsola-Shonibare and sits on the board of multiple civil society organisations such as Goree Institute and Vice Chair of the board of the International Crisis Group.

Publications 

 The Challenging Case of Nigeria (2007)
 Aspirations and Realities in Africa: Nigeria's Emerging Two-Party System? (2019)
 The Relationship between Divine and Human Law: Shari'a Law and the Nigerian Constitution (2005)

Personal life 
She is a single mother.

References 

Nigerian human rights activists
1955 births
Living people